Diego Cánepa (born May 31, 1976) is an Argentine sprint canoeist who has competed in the mid-1990s. At the 1996 Summer Olympics in Atlanta, he was eliminated in the semifinals of the K-2 500 m event.

References
Sports-Reference.com profile

External links

1976 births
Argentine male canoeists
Canoeists at the 1996 Summer Olympics
Living people
Olympic canoeists of Argentina
Place of birth missing (living people)